Virginiana is a New Latin term meaning "of Virginia", used in taxonomy to denote species indigenous to or strongly associated with the U.S. state of Virginia and its surrounding areas.

Mammals
 Didelphis virginiana, Virginia opossum

Birds
 Strix virginiana, great horned owl

Insects
 Croesia virginiana, sparganothis fruitworm moth

Plants
 Anemone virginiana, tall anemone
 Clematis virginiana, woodbine or wild hops
 Diospyros virginiana, the American persimmon
 Epifagus virginiana, beech drops
 Fragaria virginiana, wild strawberry
 Hackelia virginiana, beggar's lice, sticktight or stickseed
 Hamamelis virginiana, witch hazel
 Juniperus virginiana, eastern red-cedar
 Magnolia virginiana, sweetbay magnolia
 Medeola virginiana, Indian cucumber-root
 Osmunda virginiana, rattlesnake fern
 Ostrya virginiana, American hophornbeam
 Persicaria virginiana, jumpseed
 Physostegia virginiana, obedient plant or false dragonhead
 Pinus virginiana, Virginia pine
 Prunus virginiana, bitter-berry or chokecherry
 Quercus virginiana, southern live oak
 Rosa virginiana, Virginia rose, common wild rose or prairie rose
 Spiraea virginiana, Virginia spiraea
 Tephrosia virginiana, goat-rue
 Tradescantia virginiana, Virginia spiderwort

Fungi
 Morchella virginiana

See also
 Virginianus (disambiguation)